This is a summary of 1907 in music in the United Kingdom.

Events
21 February – Frederick Delius's new opera, A Village Romeo and Juliet is premièred at the Komische Oper Berlin, under the title Romeo und Julia auf dem Dorfe.
date unknown
John Ansell is appointed musical director at the Playhouse Theatre.
George Dyson returns to Britain after a period in continental Europe and is appointed director of music at the Royal Naval College, Osborne.

Popular music
"Follow the Colours" by Edward Elgar & Captain William de Courcy Stretton
"I Do Like To be Beside the Seaside" by John A. Glover-Kind

Classical music: new works
York Bowen – Piano Concerto No. 3 "Fantasia" Op. 23
Havergal Brian – English Suite
Dora Bright – The Dryad (ballet)
Frederick Delius – Songs of Sunset; Brigg Fair
George Dyson – Siena (lost)
Gustav Holst – A Somerset Rhapsody
Charles Villiers Stanford – Stabat Mater
Ralph Vaughan Williams – In the Fen Country (revised)

Opera
Frederick Delius – A Village Romeo and Juliet (see Events)
Edward German – Tom Jones

Musical theatre
31 January – Miss Hook of Holland, with music and lyrics by Paul Rubens, and book by Austen Hurgon and Rubens, opens at the Prince of Wales Theatre; it runs for 462 performances.
11 September – The Gay Gordons, with a book by Seymour Hicks, music by Guy Jones and lyrics by Arthur Wimperis, C. H. Bovill, Henry Hamilton and P. G. Wodehouse, opens at the Aldwych Theatre.

Publications
J. R. Sterndale – The Life of William Sterndale Bennett. Cambridge University Press.
Ernest Walker – A History of Music in England. Forgotten Books. .

Births
26 February – Harry Gold, jazz saxophonist and bandleader (died 2005)
3 March – Joy Finzi, wife of Gerald Finzi and founder of the Finzi Trust (died 1991)
12 April – Imogen Holst, conductor and composer and only child of Gustav Holst (died 1984)
18 May – Clifford Curzon, pianist (died 1982)
28 May – Reginald Foresythe, jazz pianist, arranger, composer, and bandleader (died 1958)
15 August – Bob Pearson, singer and pianist with his brother Alf as half of Bob and Alf Pearson (died 1985)
12 December – Roy Douglas, composer, pianist and arranger (died 2015)
date unknown – Charles Turner, composer and Second World War spy (died 1977)

Deaths
28 February – Rosina Brandram, operatic contralto and actress (D'Oyly Carte), 61 (heart failure)
29 October - Megan Watts Hughes, singer, songwriter and discoverer of "Voice-Figures", 65

See also
 1907 in the United Kingdom

References

British Music, 1907 in
Music
British music by year
1900s in British music